The National Endowment for the Arts (NEA) is an independent agency of the United States federal government that offers support and funding for projects exhibiting artistic excellence. It was created in 1965 as an independent agency of the federal government by an act of the U.S. Congress, signed by President Lyndon B. Johnson on September 29, 1965 (20 U.S.C. 951). It is a sub-agency of the National Foundation on the Arts and the Humanities, along with the National Endowment for the Humanities, the Federal Council on the Arts and the Humanities, and the Institute of Museum and Library Services.

The NEA  has its offices in Washington, D.C. It was awarded Tony Honors for Excellence in Theatre in 1995, as well as the Special Tony Award in 2016. In 1985, the NEA won an honorary Oscar from the Academy of Motion Picture Arts and Sciences for its work with the American Film Institute in the identification, acquisition, restoration and preservation of historic films. In 2016 and again in 2017, the National Endowment for the Arts received Emmy nominations from the Television Academy in the Outstanding Short Form Nonfiction or Reality Series category.

History and Purpose
The National Endowment for the Arts was created during the term of President Lyndon B. Johnson under the general auspices of the Great Society. According to historian Karen Patricia Heath, "Johnson personally was not much interested in the acquisition of knowledge, cultural or otherwise, for its own sake, nor did he have time for art appreciation or meeting with artists."

The NEA is "dedicated to supporting excellence in the arts, both new and established; bringing the arts to all Americans; and providing leadership in arts education".

Grants
Between 1965 and 2008, the agency has made in excess of 128,000 grants, totaling more than $5 billion. From the mid-1980s to the mid-1990s, Congress granted the NEA an annual funding of between $160 and $180 million. In 1996, Congress cut the NEA funding to $99.5 million as a result of pressure from conservative groups, including the American Family Association, who criticized the agency for using tax dollars to fund highly controversial artists such as Barbara DeGenevieve, Andres Serrano,   Robert Mapplethorpe, and the performance artists known as the "NEA Four". Since 1996, the NEA has partially rebounded with a 2015 budget of $146.21 million. For FY 2010, the budget reached the level it was at during the mid-1990s at $167.5 million but fell again in FY 2011 with a budget of $154 million.

Governance
The NEA is governed by a chairman nominated by the president to a four-year term and subject to congressional confirmation. The NEA's advisory committee, the National Council on the Arts, advises the Chairman on policies and programs, as well as reviewing grant applications, fundraising guidelines, and leadership initiative. This body consists of 14 individuals appointed by the President for their expertise and knowledge in the arts, in addition to six ex officio members of Congress who serve in a non-voting capacity.

Grantmaking
The NEA provides grants in the categories of arts projects, national initiatives, and partnership agreements. Grants for arts projects support exemplary projects for artist communities, arts education, dance, design, folk and traditional arts, literature, local arts agencies, media arts, museums, music, musical theater, opera, presenting (including multidisciplinary art forms), theater, and visual arts.
The NEA also grants individual fellowships in literature to creative writers and translators of exceptional talent in the areas of prose and poetry.

The NEA offers partnerships for state, regional, federal, international activities, and design. The state arts agencies and regional arts organizations are the NEA's primary partners in serving the American people through the arts. Forty percent of all NEA funding goes to the state arts agencies and regional arts organizations. Additionally, the NEA awards three Lifetime Honors: NEA National Heritage Fellowships to master folk and traditional artists, NEA Jazz Masters Fellowships to jazz musicians and advocates, and NEA Opera Honors to individuals who have made extraordinary contributions to opera in the United States. The NEA also manages the National Medal of Arts, awarded annually by the President.

Relative scope of funding
Artist William Powhida has noted that "in one single auction, wealthy collectors bought almost a billion dollars in contemporary art at Christie's in New York." He further commented: "If you had a 2 percent tax just on the auctions in New York you could probably double the NEA budget in two nights."

Lifetime honors
The NEA is the federal agency responsible for recognizing outstanding achievement in the arts. It does this by awarding three lifetime achievement awards. The NEA Jazz Masters Fellowships are awarded to individuals who have made significant contributions to the art of jazz. The NEA National Heritage Fellowships are awarded for artistic excellence and accomplishments for American's folk and traditional arts. The National Medal of Arts is awarded by the President of the United States and NEA for outstanding contributions to the excellence, growth, support, and availability of the arts in the United States.

Controversy

1981 attempts to abolish
Upon entering office in 1981, the incoming Ronald Reagan administration intended to push Congress to abolish the NEA completely over a three-year period. Reagan's first director of the Office of Management and Budget, David A. Stockman, thought the NEA and the National Endowment for the Humanities were "good [departments] to simply bring to a halt because they went too far, and they would be easy to defeat." Another proposal would have halved the arts endowment budget. However, these plans were abandoned when the President's special task force on the arts and humanities, which included close Reagan allies such as conservatives Charlton Heston and Joseph Coors, discovered "the needs involved and benefits of past assistance," concluding that continued federal support was important. Frank Hodsoll became the chairman of the NEA in 1981, and while the department's budget decreased from $158.8 million in 1981 to $143.5 million, by 1989 it was $169.1 million, the highest it had ever been.

1989 objections
In 1989, Donald Wildmon of the American Family Association held a press conference attacking what he called "anti-Christian bigotry," in an exhibition by photographer Andres Serrano. The work at the center of the controversy was Piss Christ, a photo of a plastic crucifix submerged in a vial of an amber fluid described by the artist as his own urine. Republican Senators Jesse Helms and Al D'Amato began to rally against the NEA, and expanded the attack to include other artists. Prominent conservative Christian figures including Pat Robertson of the 700 Club and Pat Buchanan joined the attacks. Republican representative Dick Armey, an opponent of federal arts funding, began to attack a planned exhibition of photographs by Robert Mapplethorpe at the Corcoran Museum of Art that was to receive NEA support.

On June 12, 1989, The Corcoran cancelled the Mapplethorpe exhibition, saying that it did not want to "adversely affect the NEA's congressional appropriations." The Washington Project for the Arts later hosted the Mapplethorpe show. The cancellation was highly criticized and in September, 1989, the Director of the Corcoran gallery, Christina Orr-Cahill, issued a formal statement of apology saying, "The Corcoran Gallery of Art in attempting to defuse the NEA funding controversy by removing itself from the political spotlight, has instead found itself in the center of controversy. By withdrawing from the Mapplethorpe exhibition, we, the board of trustees and the director, have inadvertently offended many members of the arts community which we deeply regret. Our course in the future will be to support art, artists and freedom of expression."

Democratic representative Pat Williams, chairman of the House subcommittee with jurisdiction over the NEA reauthorization, partnered with Republican Tom Coleman to formulate a compromise bill to save the Endowment. The Williams-Coleman substitute increased funding to states arts councils for new programs to expand access to the arts in rural and inner city areas, leave the obscenity determination to the courts, and altered the composition of the review panels to increase diversity of representation and eradicate the possibility of conflicts of interest. After fierce debate, the language embodied in the Williams-Coleman substitute prevailed and subsequently became law.

Though this controversy inspired congressional debate about appropriations to the NEA, including proposed restrictions on the content of NEA-supported work and their grantmaking guidelines, efforts to defund the NEA failed.

1990 performance artists vetoed

Conservative media continued to attack individual artists whose NEA-supported work was deemed controversial. The "NEA Four", Karen Finley, Tim Miller, John Fleck, and Holly Hughes, were performance artists whose proposed grants from the United States government's National Endowment for the Arts (NEA) were vetoed by John Frohnmayer in June 1990. Grants were overtly vetoed on the basis of subject matter after the artists had successfully passed through a peer review process. The artists won their case in court in 1993 and were awarded amounts equal to the grant money in question, though the case would make its way to the United States Supreme Court in National Endowment for the Arts v. Finley.

1995–1997 congressional attacks
The 1994 midterm elections cleared the way for House Speaker Newt Gingrich to lead a renewed attack on the NEA. Gingrich had called for the NEA to be eliminated completely along with the National Endowment for the Humanities and the Corporation for Public Broadcasting. While some in Congress attacked the funding of controversial artists, others argued the endowment was wasteful and elitist. However, despite massive budget cutbacks and the end of grants to individual artists, Gingrich ultimately failed in his push to eliminate the endowment.

Proposed defunding
The budget outline submitted by then-president Donald Trump on March 16, 2017, to Congress would eliminate all funding for the program. Congress approved a budget that retained NEA funding. The White House budget proposed for fiscal year 2018 again called for elimination of funding, but Congress retained the funding for another year.

Chairpersons
 1965–1969 Roger L. Stevens, appointed by Lyndon B. Johnson
 1969–1977 Nancy Hanks, appointed by Richard M. Nixon
 1977–1981 Livingston L. Biddle, Jr., appointed by Jimmy Carter
 1981–1989 Frank Hodsoll, appointed by Ronald Reagan
 1989–1992 John Frohnmayer, appointed by George H. W. Bush
 1993–1997 Jane Alexander, appointed by Bill Clinton
 1998–2001 Bill Ivey, appointed by Bill Clinton
 2002 Michael P. Hammond, appointed by George W. Bush
 2002–2003 Eileen Beth Mason, Acting Chairman, appointed by George W. Bush 
 2003–2009 Dana Gioia, appointed by George W. Bush
 2009 Patrice Walker Powell, Acting Chairman, appointed by Barack Obama
 2009–2012 Rocco Landesman, appointed by Barack Obama
 2012–2014 Joan Shigekawa, Acting Chairman
 2014–2018 R. Jane Chu, appointed by Barack Obama
2019–2021 Mary Anne Carter, appointed by Donald Trump
2021– Maria Rosario Jackson, appointed by Joe Biden.

Nancy Hanks (1969–77) 
Nancy Hanks, the second Chairman, was appointed by President Richard Nixon, continuing her service under Gerald Ford. During her eight-year tenure, the NEA's funding increased from $8 million to $114 million.

According to Elaine A. King:
Nancy Hanks perhaps was able to accomplish her mission because she functioned as a benevolent art dictator rather than mucking with multiple agendas and political red-tape.  From 1969 through 1977, under Hanks' administration, the Arts Endowment functioned like a fine piece of oiled machinery. Hanks continuously obtained the requested essential appropriations from Congress because of her genius in implementing the power of the lobby system.  Although she had not had direct administrative experience in the federal government, some people were skeptical at the beginning of her term.  Those in doubt underestimated her bureaucratic astuteness and her ability to direct this complex cultural office. Richard Nixon's early endorsement of the arts benefited the Arts Endowment in several ways. The budget for the Arts Endowment not only increased but more federal funding became available for numerous programs within the agency.

See also
 National Endowment for the Humanities
 National Heritage Fellowship
 National Medal of Arts winners
 NEA Jazz Masters
 New York City Department of Cultural Affairs

References

Citations

Sources 

 Statement from Jane Chu on the Conclusion of Her Term as NEA Chair on June 4, 2018

Further reading
 Arian, Edward. The Unfulfilled Promise: Public Subsidy of the Arts in America (1993)
 Benedict, Stephen, ed. Public Money and the Muse: Essays on Government Funding for the Arts (1991)
 Binkiewicz, Donna M. "Directions in arts policy history." Journal of Policy History 21.4 (2009): 424–430.
 Binkiewicz, Donna M. Federalizing the Muse: United States Arts Policy and the National Endowment for the Arts, 1965–1980, (U of North Carolina Press, 2004) 312pp., .
 Cowen, Tyler. Good and plenty: The creative successes of American arts funding (Princeton UP< 2009).
 Heath, Karen Patricia. "Artistic scarcity in an age of material abundance: President Lyndon Johnson, the National Endowment for the Arts, and Great Society liberalism." European Journal of American Culture 36.1 (2017): 5-22.   online
 Jensen, Richard. "The culture wars, 1965-1995: A historian's map." Journal of Social History (1995): 17–37. online
 Kammen, Michael. "Culture and the State in America." Journal of American History 83.3 (1996): 791–814. online
King,Elaine A. "Pluralism in the Visual Arts In the United States, 1965-1978: The National Endowment for the Arts, and Influential Force"' (Ph.D. Dissertation, Northwestern University, 1986).
 Levy, Alan Howard. Government and the arts: Debates over federal support of the arts in America from George Washington to Jesse Helms (UP of America, 1997).
 Love, Jeffrey. "Sorting out our roles: The state arts agencies and the national endowment for the arts." Journal of Arts Management and Law 21.3 (1991): 215–226.
 Lowell, Julia F. "State Arts Agencies 1965-2003. Whose Interests to Serve?: (RAND Paper No. RAND/MG-121. RAND CORP, 2004). online
 Marquis, Alice Goldfarb. Art lessons: Learning from the rise and fall of public arts funding (1995).
 NEA. National Endowment for the Arts: a brief history, 1965-2006: an excerpt --the beginning through the Hanks era (1986)  Online free
 Ottley, Gary, and Richard Hanna. "Do consumers know enough to assess the true value of art? A study of beliefs and attitudes toward the NEA." Journal of Public Affairs 18.2 (2018): e1654.
 Schuster, J. Mark. "Sub-national cultural policy--where the action is: Mapping state cultural policy in the United States." International journal of cultural policy 8.2 (2002): 181–196.
 Uy, Michael Sy. Ask the Experts: How Ford, Rockefeller, and the NEA Changed American Music, (Oxford University Press, 2020) 270pp.

Primary sources
 Alexander, Jane. Command Performance: an Actress in the Theater of Politics. (Public Affairs, 2000) Chairman of the NEA 1993-1997
 Biddle, Livingston. Our government and the arts: A perspective from the inside (1988),  drafted NEA legislation; senior NEA official
 Frohnmayer, John. Leaving Town Alive: Confessions of an Arts Warrior (1992) NEA Chairman 1989 to 1992
 Straight, Michael. Nancy Hanks: an intimate portrait: the creation of a national commitment to the arts.  (1988) Nancy Hanks  was NEA Chairman 1969–77; Michael Straight was her deputy chairman.

External links
 
 National Foundation on the Arts and the Humanities in the Federal Register
  publications by and about NEA online free
 NEA Small Press Collection From the Rare Book and Special Collections Division at the Library of Congress

1965 establishments in Washington, D.C.
Arts councils of the United States
Arts organizations established in 1965
Government agencies established in 1965
Great Society programs
Independent agencies of the United States government
 
Organizations awarded an Academy Honorary Award
Special Tony Award recipients
National Foundation on the Arts and the Humanities